Union Yacoub El Mansour is a Moroccan football club currently playing in the third division. The club is located in the city of Rabat.

Honours

Moroccan GNFA 1 Championship: 1
2004

References

Football clubs in Morocco
Sport in Rabat
Sports clubs in Morocco